Nor the Moon by Night is a 1958 British drama film directed by Ken Annakin and starring Belinda Lee. It was based on the novel by Joy Packer and partly filmed in the Kruger National Park, South Africa. The title is a quote from the Old Testament passage (Psalm 121:6); "The sun shall not smite thee by day, nor the moon by night."

The film was released in the United States as Elephant Gun. It has several sections in Swahili but is not subtitled.

Plot summary
Two brothers, Rusty and Andrew Miller, are game wardens in Africa. Andrew's fiancée visits from the UK, and falls in love with Rusty.

A broken headlight caused by a crashed Land Rover starts a bush fire, and the humans try to beat it out as the wildlife stampedes to escape. Meanwhile, Andrew has tied himself into a tree to escape the lions but threatens to be burnt in the fire.

Cast
Belinda Lee ...  Alice Lang  
Michael Craig  ...  Rusty  
Patrick McGoohan  ...  Andrew Miller  
Anna Gaylor  ...  Thea Boryslawski  
Eric Pohlmann  ...  Boryslawski  
Pamela Stirling  ...  Mrs. Boryslawski  
Lionel Ngakane  ...  Nimrod  
Joan Brickhill  ...  Harriet Carver  
Ben Heydenrych  ...  Sergeant Van Wyck  
Alfred Kumalo  ...  Chief  
Doreen Hlantie  ...  Oasis

Production

Development
Joy Packer's novel was published in 1957. Film rights were bought by Sir John Davis of the Rank Film Organisation, in part because Davis' wife Dinah Sheridan was a fan of the novel. Packer later wrote she sold the rights via a "contract which reduced me to nothing and made me feel like the man who sold his shadow to the devil".

In the late 1950s, the Rank Organisation made a series of adventure films in colour shot on location which were aimed at the international audience. These included The Black Tent, Robbery Under Arms, Ferry to Hong Kong, Campbell's Kingdom and Nor the Moon by Night.

The film was directed by Ken Annakin. He says that he did not really want to do the job. The film he really wanted to make was The Singer Not the Song. He agreed because it gave him the chance to see South Africa.

Packer says producer John Stafford flew out to South Africa to meet with her and secure her help in making the movie. He showed her the script which she found "amazingly fresh and new. The basic situation and a few names and places were vaguely familiar. I recognised none of the dialogue and only part of the action, but the story sounded exciting."

Packer felt Belinda Lee was physically miscast to play the role, but Annakin pointed out she was under contract and felt "she'll play Alice very convincingly. She's very intense - is Belinda". Filmink said "Lee’s part was in the "sensible girl" realm, a spinster who discovers love on the veldt in between being attacked by wildlife."

Packer later wrote "none of the cast bore the faintest resemblance to my characters."

Shooting
Filming began on 23 November 1957 on location in South Africa. The unit was based at Cato Ridge. The bulk of location shooting took place in the Valley of a Thousand Hills near Durban, with second unit work involving animals hear Johannesburg. At one stage the film was known as The Voice of the Lion.

Production was plagued by a number of difficulties. Belinda Lee left the unit during the shoot to see her married lover in Italy who had been threatening to kill himself; they both attempted suicide. Patrick McGoohan suffered concussion after crashing his car. Anna Gaylor fell ill with dysentery.

Director Ken Annakin had a number of issues with the crew; he later wrote that the electricians sabotaged director of photography Peter Hennessey's rushes with incorrect light filters, forcing him to be replaced by Harry Waxman. The cast and crew consistently fell sick, with snake and spider bites, heat exhaustion, dysentery, rheumatism and chest complaints the chief cause.

Michael Craig wrote in his memoirs that Annakin was known among the crew "not very lovingly" as "Panickin' Annakin".

Lee returned from Italy on 2 February 1958 to recommence filming. She flew into Johannesburg Airport, then took a flight to Durban. Questions were asked in South African parliament whether Lee was given special treatment to get into the country as a customs and immigration officer went to meet her on the plane at Johannesburg airport so she could avoid the press. "I regret any harm I have done to anyone in Italy," she said.

One of the cheetahs used in filming savaged its trainer. A bush fire got out of control. Michael Craig, although married, had an affair on set with a woman called Shirley. He also almost drowned crossing a river.

At one point, Michael Craig was the only one of the four leads available at work. He later quipped "I'm left alone for three weeks with a film crew and a lot of monkeys." Annakin said "one day there was only me and a snake available to work." However Annakin did meet his future wife Pauline during filming.

The unit returned to London in April 1958 where some additional scenes were shot, including a new ending. "I feel as if I have just come out of prison", said Lee on her return. "I have been watched and questioned all the time. I'm 22 and hope to marry again before I'm 80. Love is the important thing. I believe in letting my heart rule my head." Filming took around a month.

The movie was completed over budget and behind schedule. Rank terminated Lee's contract, and she never worked for the studio again. The job of directing The Singer Not the Song was taken from Annakin and given to Roy Ward Baker.

Rank said the combined cost of the film and three others - Innocent Sinners, The Wind Cannot Read and Night to Remember - was £1,100,000.

Reception
Variety praised the photography but criticised the acting and script.

The film managed to recoup its costs in Europe and made a profit after its release in the United States.

Annakin later said "the picture was a mediocre hotch potch."

References

Notes

External links

Nor the Moon by Night at BFI Screenonline
Nor the Moon by Night at BFI

Review of film at New York Times
[http://www.colonialfilm.org.uk/node/1340 Nor the Moon by Night'] at Colonial Film''

1958 films
1958 drama films
Films directed by Ken Annakin
Films scored by James Bernard
Films shot at Pinewood Studios
Films shot in South Africa
Films set in South Africa
Films based on South African novels
British drama films
Films about brothers
1950s English-language films
1950s British films